Dradura (own spelling: DRADURA) is an internationally operating group of companies consolidated. The holding is based in Altleiningen in the Rhineland-Palatinate administrative district of Bad Dürkheim. The parent company is located in the Palatinate Forest.

History 

1423 was the beginning of copper and iron mining in the Altleiningen valley. Johann Nikolaus II Gienanth leased an iron smelt from the Court of Leiningen in 1729. In 1811, Napoleon Bonaparte issued the permit to build a wire drawing factory in Altleiningen which was acquired by the Kuhn-family in 1860. In 1941, Georg Stein acquired the wire drawing factory which produced mainly dowels and chains at that time.

In 1948, the product range was extended and new machines were purchased. In 1957 the company launches the production of wire goods. The limited commercial partnership Drahtwarenfabrik Drahtzug Stein developed from the company in 1961 and one year later the production of dishwasher baskets started. In 1964, the company developed a patented system for the production of seamless flux-cored wires which went into production two years later.

In 1973, the company founded its first subsidiary Drahtzug Stein saprofil (Société Sablaise de Produits en Fil de Fer) in France.

2000 - 2009
In 2000, the corporation acquired an interest in the company Califil in France. The company Drahtwarenfabrik Drahtzug Stein GmbH & Co. KG was converted into a holding company in 2001.

In 2003, the Drahtzug Stein Beteiligungsgesellschaft mbH (investment company) was founded. In the following year, the company DSWI sp.zo.o. (today: Drahtzug Stein lodz) was established as joint venture with Wire Industries in Lodz, Poland. With these measures, Drahtzug Stein follows the outsourcing of the appliance industry to Eastern Europe. In 2006, the competitor Wire Industries was acquired by the Drahtzug Stein Holding. The Italian and Spanish brands of Wire Industries, Omim and Come, continued independently. 

In 2005, the subsidiary Drahtzug Stein spb was established in St. Petersburg, and in 2007, Drahtzug Stein usa Corp. was founded in the New Bern, North Carolina. 
The workforce in Altleiningen increased from eight workers in 1941 to about 550 in 2009. The entire group occupied around 1,350 employees in 2009.

In 2016 Dradura was sold by the Stein family to private equity investor Emeram Capital Partners and in 2021 parts of the original Dradura group went through an insolvency process.

2021 - to date
In 2021 Dradura was taken over by FMC Industrial GmbH, Bremen, from the previous owner. Part of the new DRADURA Group GmbH are five of the original manufacturing sites: Altleiningen, Germany; Lodz, Poland; Omim in San Dona di Piave, Italy; Come in Conzano, Italy and New Bern, NC, USA.

Logo 

The thinner blue stripes symbolize the thin to thick diameters of wires, which are supposed to symbolize the look ahead as well as the ambitiousness of Drahtzug Stein. The long blue stripe represents the base, the foundation of the company over the entire spectrum.

Structure of the consortium 

The DRADURA Group GmbH consists of five subsidiaries.
These subsidiaries bear the entrepreneurial responsibility for their department and are regionally and globally in the holding’s custody responsible for the management of their business activities. The consortium is divided into three business fields:

 wire&welding (welding consumables such as seamless flux-cored welding wires and solid wires, spools and modification wires)
 drahtwaren, łódz, omim, come, usa (wire goods for dishwashers, cookers, ovens, barbecues/grills and microwaves, wire goods for refrigerators and freezers and special applications)
 service (internal service provider)

Locations 
Current locations:
 Altleiningen (Germany)
 Dradura Group GmbH
 Łodź (Poland)
 Dradura Polska Sp. z o. o.
 New Bern (USA)
 Dradura USA Corp.
 Italy
 Dradura Italia S.R.L (San Donà di Piave)
 Dradura Italia S.R.L (Conzano)

Previous locations (not part of DRADURA Group GmbH): 
 France
 Dradura France Cusset SAS (Cusset)
 Saprofil S.A.R.L. (Olonne-sur-Mer)
 Tschechien 
 Dradura Česká rebublika s.r.o. (Olomouc)

References

External links

Companies based in Rhineland-Palatinate
Manufacturing companies of Germany